Dave Johnson is a comic book artist known for his cover work. For Image Comics he has worked on titles including Erik Larsen's SuperPatriot and Robert Kirkman's Invincible. For DC Comics he has provided covers to titles such as Detective Comics and the DC/Vertigo book 100 Bullets, for which he won the 2002 Eisner Award for Best Cover Artist. His Marvel Comics work includes covers for Deadpool. He has also done some writing, as on Batman: Black and White #6 and Batman: Legends of the Dark Knight #194.

In 2022 he was among the three dozen contributors to the benefit book Comics for Ukraine: Sunflower Seeds, whose profits would be donated to relief efforts for Ukrainian refugees resulting from the February 2022 Russian invasion of Ukraine.

Early life
Dave Johnson was born in Pittsburgh, and moved to Georgia as a child. He has a younger sister. He discovered comics as a child, though he lost interest in them. His interest in the medium was renewed in the late 1970s, beginning with Chris Claremont and John Byrne's run on The Uncanny X-Men. Johnson has named Byrne and Michael Golden as two of his main influences. Johnson studied painting at the Art Institute of Atlanta, but ultimately became more interested in illustration, specifically on the ability to instantly convey information in a single image, explaining at WonderCon in 2009, "[With] billboards, you have five seconds to deliver a message." Applying this idea to comics covers, he said, "You're walking down the aisle (at your comic shop), and the simpler the design, and the brighter and bolder the covers, the better an idea it is. You say 'Batman,' and get the whole message at once."

Career
In 1985 began working for Comico on the title Robotech.

In 2002 John was awarded the 2002 Eisner Award for Best Cover Artist for his work on the DC Comics book Detective Comics and the DC/Vertigo book 100 Bullets.

In April 2022, Johnson was reported among the more than three dozen comics creators who contributed to Operation USA's benefit anthology book, Comics for Ukraine: Sunflower Seeds, a project spearheaded by editor Scott Dunbier, whose profits would be donated to relief efforts for Ukrainian refugees resulting from the February 2022 Russian invasion of Ukraine. Johnson would provide one of the covers to the softcover version of the book.

Technique and materials
When doing covers, Johnson prefers to think out all of his preliminary work for a week before rendering his ideas within an hour. He does not like presenting editors with a large number of cover ideas, preferring instead to deliver the final products, saying that "most editors are clueless" about covers. When painting, Johnson begins by applying the darkest pigments, before layering on lighter colors with acrylic, saying, "I'm trying to be less opaque and more brushy. I'm a terrible painter; it's a pure accident that it comes out as good as it does." When doing painted covers, he prefers do so fully, without completing a substantial amount of the image digital, although he does employ a digital greywash technique for layering.

References

External links

 Dave Johnson at DC Comics.
 Dave Johnson at Comic Art Fans Gallery
 

Living people
Year of birth missing (living people)
20th-century American male artists
21st-century American male artists
DC Comics people
Image Comics
Eisner Award winners for Best Cover Artist